The Fossar de les Moreres (literally "Grave of the Mulberries") is a memorial square in Barcelona (Catalonia, Spain), adjacent to the basilica of Santa Maria del Mar. The plaza was built over a cemetery where defenders of the city were buried following the Siege of Barcelona at the end of the War of the Spanish Succession in 1714. The plaza features a memorial to the fallen Catalans of the war, with a torch of eternal flame and a heroic poem by Frederic Soler, "El Fossar de les Moreres".

In the aftermath of the War of Spanish Succession, Catalonia suffered a loss of autonomy.  The subsequent royal decrees known as the Decretos de Nueva Planta abolished the furs (fueros) of Catalonia as well as institutions that dated back to the time of the Crown of Aragon and beyond. At a later date the public use of the Catalan language was banned for public documents.  The Decretos dealt not only with Catalonia, but also with other parts of Spain and the empire as a whole.

Given this tumultuous history connected with the decrees and the war, the Fossar de les Moreres is a place of remembrance every year during the National Day of Catalonia (Diada Nacional de Catalunya in Catalan). The holiday commemorates the date on which Barcelona fell, 11 September, and Catalans yearly pay homage to the defenders of city who were killed and are buried at the memorial.

See also
History of Catalonia
Decrets de Nova Planta
Catalan nationalism
 Mercat del Born

Eternal flames
Plazas in Barcelona
Military history of Catalonia
Ciutat Vella
Monuments and memorials in Barcelona